The 1942–43 season was Chelsea Football Club's fourth season of wartime football during the Second World War. As the Football League and the FA Cup were suspended for the duration, the club instead competed in regional competitions. Records and statistics for these matches are considered unofficial. Due to the disruption of the war, the club often fielded guest players from other clubs. Chelsea finished 8th in the 18-team Football League South.

Notes

References

External links
 Chelsea in the Second World War at chelseafc.com

1942–43
English football clubs 1942–43 season